Milan Pančevski (Macedonian: Милан Панчевски; 16 May 1935 – 9 January 2019) was a Macedonian politician who was the final President of the League of Communists of Yugoslavia from 1989 to 1990, when the party was dissolved.

Early life 
Prior to being President of the League of Communists of Yugoslavia, he was President of the League of Communists of Macedonia from 1984 to 1986. He was active in politics after the Breakup of Yugoslavia, and joined the Social Democratic Union of Macedonia.

He died in Skopje on 9 January 2019.

References 

1935 births
2019 deaths
People from Debar
Central Committee of the League of Communists of Yugoslavia members
Presidency of the Socialist Federal Republic of Yugoslavia members
Social Democratic Union of Macedonia politicians